The Cavendish Beach Music Festival is a music festival held in mid-July in Cavendish, Prince Edward Island, Canada. The festival is produced by Whitecap Entertainment.

History
In 2009, its inaugural year, the festival was a three-day event and featured major acts Rik Reese & Neon Highway, Tim McGraw, Big & Rich, and Reba McEntire. Additional acts included Paul Brandt, Doc Walker, and Deric Ruttan.

In 2010, the festival was extended to five days and the site included the 2011 construction of a permanent stage and other supporting infrastructure.  New to the festival for 2010 was a day featuring local artists in a partnership with the East Coast Music Association named "ECMA at the Beach".  Major acts in 2010 included Keith Urban, Little Big Town, Taylor Swift, and Lady Antebellum. Additional acts included Emerson Drive, Gloriana, The Road Hammers, Shane Yellowbird, Dean Brody, Melanie Morgan, Gord Bamford, Tara Oram, Victoria Banks, and Ashley MacIsaac.

Country music superstar Taylor Swift took the stage on July 10, the third day of the festival where approximately 35,000 people were in attendance.

In 2011, the festival was a four-day event with major acts Trace Adkins, Johnny Reid, Brad Paisley and Toby Keith.  Additional acts included Eric Church, George Canyon, Tanya Tucker, Aaron Lines, Chad Brownlee, Ricky Skaggs, Corb Lund, and Doc Walker.

In 2012, the festival included major acts Dierks Bentley, Alabama, and Rascal Flatts.

In 2013, the festival included major acts Dwight Yoakam, Kenny Chesney, Dixie Chicks. Additional acts included Little Big Town, Jason Blaine and Michelle Wright.

On November 26, 2013, the event announced a lineup of Lady Antebellum, Blake Shelton, Hunter Hayes, Darius Rucker, Gord Bamford, and Brett Kissel.

On December 3, 2014, the event announced a lineup of Eric Church, Keith Urban, Brantley Gilbert, Kira Isabella & The Mavericks.

The 2016 Cavendish Beach Music Festival featured The Band Perry, Blake Shelton, Kenny Chesney, Bobby Wills and Emerson Drive.

The 2017 Cavendish Beach Music Festival was a three-day event whose lineup included Kip Moore, Zac Brown Band, Chad Brownlee, and Little Big Town.

The 2018 Festival expanded to a four-day event whose lineup included Luke Bryan, Shawn Mendes, Chris Young, and Brett Eldredge. This is the first time in six years that the festival has become a four-day event.

The 2019 Cavendish Beach Music Festival presented by Bell was a three-day event whose lineup included Eric Church, Carrie Underwood, Cam and Russell Dickerson.

After a 2 year hiatus due to Covid-19 the 2022 festival welcomed concert goers back to Cavendish. Headliners for the three day festival included Luke Combs, Darius Rucker & Dustin Lynch.

Awards and nominations

See also

List of country music festivals 
List of festivals in Prince Edward Island
List of music festivals in Canada

References

Folk festivals in Canada
Country music festivals in Canada
Music festivals in Prince Edward Island
Music festivals established in 2009